Carragher is a surname. Notable people with the surname include:

Anna Carragher (born 1948), Irish broadcasting executive and television producer
Gavin Carragher (born 1933), Australian sprinter
James Carragher (born 2002), English footballer
Jamie Carragher (born 1978), English footballer
Matt Carragher (1976–2016), English footballer